Viñac District is one of thirty-three districts of the Yauyos Province in the Lima Region of Peru.

References